River Shira is the river that runs for about 7 miles through Glen Shira, originating to the north-east at  altitude, near the start of the River Fyne.

The river runs into the Lochan Shira reservoir, feeding the 5 MW  (Big Nose) power station dams at  altitude and dropping . The river includes a few waterfalls and islands, including  (The Island of Fear).

It eventually flows into Loch Dubh (Black Lake), where the Ancient Clan MacNaghten castle and crannogs used to be, and then by Stuart Liddell's house. Loch Dubh drains through the short  (River Garron) into the sea loch Loch Fyne.

The river lends its name to the ferry .

References

External links
 Aerial views of the reservoir

Rivers of Argyll and Bute